The Guardian Children's Fiction Prize or Guardian Award was a literary award that annual recognised one fiction book written for children or young adults (at least age eight) and published in the United Kingdom. It was conferred upon the author of the book by The Guardian newspaper, which established it in 1965 and inaugurated it in 1967. It was a lifetime award in that previous winners were not eligible. At least from 2000 the prize was £1,500. The prize was apparently discontinued after 2016, though no formal announcement appears to have been made.

Recent winners

Piers Torday won the 2014 Guardian Prize, announced 13 November, for The Dark Wild from Quercus Publishing. It is the second book of a trilogy inaugurated by The Last Wild, whose conclusion The Wild Beyond is forthcoming April 2015.

The judges were Guardian children's book editor Julia Eccleshare and three British children's writers (as always): 2012 prize winner Frank Cottrell Boyce, Gillian Cross, and Katherine Rundell.

The longlist of eight was announced late in June, the shortlist of four early in October.

 Kate DiCamillo, Flora & Ulysses, illus. K. G. Campbell (Walker Books), Age 9+ 
 Natasha Farrant, Flora in Love (Faber & Faber), Age 12+
 Candy Gourlay, Shine (David Fickling Books), Age 12+
 E. Lockhart, We Were Liars, (Hot Key Books; U.S., Delacorte Press), Age 12+ 
 S. F. Said, Phoenix, illus. Dave McKean (David Fickling Books), Age 10+
 Marcus Sedgwick, She Is Not Invisible (Orion Books), Age 12+
 Francesca Simon, The Lost Gods (Faber/ Profile), Age 9+ 
 Piers Torday, The Dark Wild (Quercus), Age 11+

DiCamillo and Flora & Ulysses won the annual Newbery Medal from the American Library Association as the most distinguished US children's book published during 2013.

Torday was inspired to write books by the success of his father, Paul Torday (1946–2013), whose first book was published in 2006 when he was 59 years old.

Latest rendition 
Rebecca Stead of New York City won the 2013 Guardian Prize, covering books published August 2012 to July 2013, for Liar & Spy, which was published by Andersen Press in the UK and Wendy Lamb Books in the US. Stead became the first winning writer from outside the British Commonwealth in the second year that all new children's books published in Britain were eligible.

History

The prize was established in 1965 as the "only children's book award made to writers by their fellow authors"(2005 shortlist) and inaugurated by the 1967 award to Leon Garfield for Devil in the Fog (Constable & Co., 1966). Through the 2000 prize, announced 28 March, it recognised one book published in the UK during the preceding calendar year.

Between the 1999/2000 and 2000/2001 cycles, the prize schedule was rearranged to culminate in October during Booktrust Children's Book Week. "[F]iction for children aged seven and above, published in the UK between January 2000 and September 2001" (21 months) was eligible for the 2001 prize. Publishers were required to submit no more than ten entries by April 30.

At the same time, a summer program was inaugurated, using the newspaper's educational website and featuring a longlist announced in July. The program initially comprised merely an opportunity to vote for longlist favourites, comments by the judges to guide summer reading, and advice on "how to build a classic library of children's books".(2001 longlist) A version of the ongoing Young Critics contest was inaugurated in 2002 and the program has expanded since then to include online discussion and author interviews and appearances. Meanwhile, announcement of the longlist has advanced to late May or early June and announcement of the winner has retreated to November.

Conditions 
The shortlist of no more than four books and the winner were selected by three children's fiction writers, almost always including the latest winner. The Guardian described the prize as the only children's book award winner selected by peers. The newspaper's children's book editor Julia Eccleshare participated (from 2000 to 2016) in selection of the longlist and thereafter chaired the panel of final judges.

In years to 2016 there was a longlist of eight books announced in May or June, a shortlist of no more than four announced in September, and a single winner. The longlist was the foundation for a summer program of reading, reviewing, and discussion.

The U.K. publishers of eligible books entered them for the prize with a fee, although the chair may call for submission. The publication year is August to July of the current year, but May, June, and July books must be submitted in advance. Books originally published in another language were eligible in English translation for five years.

Routinely, eligible books were entered for the prize by their UK publishers, as many as ten books each (2000) although chair Eccleshare also called for particular submissions.

Winners

Through 2016 there were 52 prizes awarded in 49 years covering 1966 to mid-2015 publications. There were co-winners in 1992 and 1996.

Winners of multiple awards

Six books have won both the Guardian Children's Fiction Prize and the Carnegie Medal (inaugurated 1936), which annually recognizes an outstanding book for children or young adults.
(Dates are years of U.K. publication, which were Carnegie award dates before 2006.)
 Alan Garner, The Owl Service (1967)
 Richard Adams, Watership Down (1972)
 Geraldine McCaughrean, A Pack of Lies (1988)
 Anne Fine, Goggle-Eyes (1989)
 Philip Pullman, His Dark Materials 1: Northern Lights (1995)
 Melvin Burgess, Junk (1996)
Northern Lights was named "Carnegie of Carnegies" for the 70-year celebration of that award in 2007.

2003. The Curious Incident of the Dog in the Night-Time by Mark Haddon (David Fickling, 2002) won the 2003 Whitbread Awards as the year's best novel (not children's book) and the "Book of the Year" across all five categories. The Guardian children's book editor Eccleshare wrote, "Published on both an adult and a children's list, it is one of the few titles for which the ubiquitous claim of "crossover" is not a gimmick. It genuinely has equal, though different, appeal to all readers – 15-year-old Christopher Boone's narrative voice is at once childlike in its observations, and adult in its profundity."(2003 winner)

2001. The Seeing Stone by Kevin Crossley-Holland won the Tir na n-Og Award, best English-language book for young people with "authentic Welsh background".

Summer programme 

The Young Critics competition was inaugurated in 2002 and is still underway. The newspaper solicited 200-word reviews of books on the longlist from children 16 and younger, with the prize being "a day editing and printing up their reviews".(retrospective by CA, 23 Sep 2002)

Ten years later there are dual competitions for children 17 and younger, one for individuals and one for teams of at least four schoolmates. There are cash prizes and free sets of the longlist books to the winners. Up to 30 students from the winning school also get a day at one Guardian site.(2012 Young Critics)
The Young Critics contests are judged by Eccleshare, who also helps select the longlist, and another Guardian editor."The Guardian Young Critics Competition 2012"

Beside the competition there is a summer book club that features one longlist book each week, with author interviews and discussion.

Longlists and shortlists 

Since the award cycle was rescheduled to conclude late in the year, between 2000 and 2001, a "longlist" of seven to ten books has been announced near mid-year, recently in May. During that same period, a shortlist of four to six books has been announced a few months later.

Bold and hash (#) mark the winner, plus (+) marks the rest of the shortlist, and dash (–) marks the rest of the longlist.

2015 (8)

 # David Almond, A Song for Ella Grey (Hodder)
 + Frances Hardinge, The Lie Tree (Macmillan)
 + Sally Nicholls, An Island of our Own (Scholastic)
 + Kate Saunders, Five Children on the Western Front (Faber) – sequel to the 1902 classic Five Children and It 
 - Cece Bell, El Deafo (Amulet Books) 
 - Sarah Crossan, Apple and Rain (Bloomsbury) 
 - Jennifer Niven, All the Bright Places  (Penguin)
 - Jon Walter, My Name's Not Friday (David Fickling)2014 (8)
 # Piers Torday, The Dark Wild (Quercus), Age 11+ + Kate DiCamillo, Flora & Ulysses, illus. K. G. Campbell (Walker; U.S., Candlewick) 9+ 
 + E. Lockhart, We Were Liars, (Hot Key; U.S., Delacorte) 12+ 
 + S. F. Said, Phoenix, illus. Dave McKean (David Fickling) 10+
 – Natasha Farrant, Flora in Love (Faber) 12+
 – Candy Gourlay, Shine (David Fickling) 12+
 – Marcus Sedgwick, She Is Not Invisible (Orion) 12+
 – Francesca Simon, The Lost Gods (Faber/Profile) 9+

DiCamillo and Flora & Ulysses won the annual Newbery Medal from the American Library Association as the most distinguished U.S. children's book published during 2013.

The longlist and shortlist were announced 28 June and 4 October, both about a month later than usual.2013 (8)
 # Rebecca Stead, Liar & Spy (Andersen), Age 10+ + David Almond, The Boy Who Swam With Piranhas, illus. Oliver Jeffers (Walker), Age 9+
 + John Green, The Fault in Our Stars (Penguin), Age 12+
 + Katherine Rundell, Rooftoppers (Faber), Age 10+
 – Gillian Cross, After Tomorrow (Oxford), Age 10+ 
 – Sally Gardner, Maggot Moon (Hot Key Books), Age 12+
 – William Sutcliffe, The Wall (Bloomsbury), Age 12+
 – Lydia Syson, A World Between Us (Hot Key Books), Age 14+

Stead was the first American winner of the Prize, which was opened to writers from outside the British Commonwealth in 2012.

Gardner and Maggot Moon won the annual Carnegie Medal from the British librarians, recognizing the best children's book published in Britain during the twelve months to August 2012.2012 (8) 
 # Frank Cottrell Boyce, The Unforgotten Coat, photographs by Carl Hunter and Clare Heney (Walker)  9+ +  Roddy Doyle, A Greyhound of a Girl (Scholastic)  12+
 +  Jack Gantos, Dead End in Norvelt (Corgi)   12+
 +  Eva Ibbotson, The Abominables (Scholastic)   8+
 –  Aidan Chambers, Dying to Know You (Bodley Head)  14+
 –  Russell Hoban, Soonchild, illus. Alexis Deacon (Walker)   14+
 –  Ally Kennen, Bullet Boys (Scholastic)   14+
 –  Dave Shelton, A Boy and a Bear in a Boat (David Fickling)   9+

This was Eva Ibbotson's second year on the shortlist after her death October 2010.

Gantos and Dead End in Norvelt won the Newbery Medal for calendar year 2011's "most distinguished contribution to American children's literature" (for readers up to age 14). 2011 (8) 
 # Andy Mulligan, Return to Ribblestrop (Simon & Schuster)  10+ + David Almond, My Name is Mina (Hodder)   9+
 + Frances Hardinge, Twilight Robbery (Macmillan)   11+
 + Simon Mason, Moon Pie (David Fickling)   10+
 – Lissa Evans, Small Change for Stuart (Doubleday)   8+
 – Saci Lloyd, Momentum (Hodder)   12+
 – Annabel Pitcher, My Sister Lives on the Mantelpiece (Orion)   10+
 – Andy Stanton, Mr Gum and the Secret Hideout, illus. David Tazzyman (Egmont)  7+

Mulligan made the 2012 Carnegie Medal shortlist with a different work, Trash (late 2010). Almond, Evans, and Pitcher made that shortlist with their Guardian Prize contenders.2010 (8)
 # Michelle Paver, Ghost Hunter (Orion)   10+ + Morris Gleitzman, Now (Puffin)  9+
 + Gregory Hughes, Unhooking the Moon (Quercus)   11+
 + Eva Ibbotson, The Ogre of Oglefort (Macmillan)   8+
 – Theresa Breslin, Prisoner of the Inquisition (Doubleday)   12+
 – Ally Kennen, Sparks (Marion Lloyd Books)   9+
 – Linda Newbery, Lob, illustrated by Pam Smy (David Fickling)   8+
 – Marcus Sedgwick, White Crow (Orion)   13+

Paver won for concluding a six-volume series. According to JE, "It's relatively rare for a book late in a series to win a major prize, but the Chronicles of Ancient Darkness is such a towering achievement, as a whole as well as in terms of the individual books, that it was our unanimous choice." But Philip Reeve won in 2006 for concluding a four-volume series. On the shortlist, Gleitzman's Now was the third of a trilogy.

Brennan and Sedwick made the Carnegie Medal shortlist for the listed works.2009 (8)
 # Mal Peet, Exposure (Walker)   + Siobhan Dowd, Solace of the Road (David Fickling)
 + Morris Gleitzman, Then (Puffin)
 + Terry Pratchett, Nation (Doubleday)
 – Bernard Beckett, Genesis (Quercus)
 – Sally Gardner, The Silver Blade (Orion)
 – Julie Hearn, Rowan the Strange (Oxford)
 – Marcus Sedgwick, Revolver (Orion)

Hearn, Pratchett, and Sedwick made the Carnegie Medal shortlist for the listed works.2008 (7)
 # Patrick Ness, The Knife of Never Letting Go (Walker)   13+ + Frank Cottrell Boyce, Cosmic (Macmillan)   9+
 + Siobhan Dowd, Bog Child (David Fickling)   13+
 + Jenny Downham, Before I Die (Definitions)   13+
 – Tanya Landman, The Goldsmith's Daughter (Walker)   11+
 – Rhiannon Lassiter, Bad Blood (Oxford)   12+
 – Anthony McGowan, The Knife That Killed Me (Definitions)   14+

Siobhan Dowd won the Carnegie Medal for the listed work; Cottrell Boyce and Ness made the shortlist.2007 (8)
 # Jenny Valentine, Finding Violet Park (HarperCollins) 12+ + Mary Hoffman, The Falconer's Knot (Bloomsbury) 11+
 + Sally Prue, The Truth Sayer (Oxford) 10+
 + Andy Stanton, Mr Gum and the Biscuit Billionaire (Egmont) 7+
 – Allan Ahlberg, The Boyhood of Burglar Bill (Puffin) 8+
 – Charlie Fletcher, Stoneheart (Hodder) 10+
 – Tim Lott, Fearless (Walker) 12+
 – Mal Peet, The Penalty (Walker) 12+

Valentine made the Carnegie Medal shortlist for the Prize-winning book.2006 (8)
 # Philip Reeve, A Darkling Plain (Scholastic) 11+ + Patrick Cave, Blown Away (Simon & Schuster) 13+
 + Frank Cottrell Boyce, Framed (Macmillan) 11+
 + Frances Hardinge, Fly by Night (Macmillan) 11+
 – David Almond, Clay (Hodder) 12+
 – Siobhan Dowd, A Swift Pure Cry (Doubleday) 12+
 – Jill Murphy, The Worst Witch Saves the Day (Penguin) 8–11
 – Tim Wynne-Jones, The Survival Game (Usborne Publishing) 10+

Reeve won for concluding a four-volume series. Almond and Cottrell Boyce made the Carnegie Medal shortlist for the listed works.2005 (8)
 # Kate Thompson, The New Policeman (Bodley Head, Doubleday) 11+ +  Julie Hearn, The Merrybegot (Oxford) 10+ —a tale of folk religion in the 17th century 
 +  Alex Shearer, The Hunted (Macmillan) 11+
 +  Tim Wynne-Jones, The Boy in the Burning House (Groundwood Books, 2000; Usborne) 10+ 
 –  Kevin Brooks, Candy (Chicken House) 13+
 –  Michelle Paver, Wolf Brother (Orion) 9+
 –  Philippa Pearce, The Little Gentleman (Puffin) 9+
 –  Christopher Russell, Brind and the Dogs of War (Puffin) 10+

Paver's book was the first in a series of six, the Chronicles of Ancient Darkness (2004 to 2009). She won the 2010 Prize for the concluding volume, Ghost Hunter.2004 (8)
 # Meg Rosoff, How I Live Now (Puffin) 14+ + Frank Cottrell Boyce, Millions (Macmillan) 9+
 + Ann Turnbull, No Shame, No Fear (Walker) 10+
 + Leslie Wilson, Last Train from Kummersdorf (Faber) 11+
 – Kevin Brooks, Kissing the Rain (Chicken House) 13+
 – Patricia Elliott, Murkmere (Hodder) 10+
 – Jan Mark, Useful Idiots (David Fickling) 13+
 – Michael Morpurgo, Private Peaceful (Collins) 10+

Cottrell Boyce won the Carnegie Medal for the listed work; Morpurgo made the shortlist.2003 (8)
 # Mark Haddon, The Curious Incident of the Dog in the Night-Time (Jonathan Cape, David Fickling) 12+ 
 + David Almond, The Fire Eaters (Hodder) 10+
 + Kevin Brooks, Lucas (Chicken House) 12+
 + Alex Shearer, The Speed of the Dark (Macmillan) 11+
 – Keith Gray, Malarkey (Red Fox) 13+
 – Simon French, Where in the World (Little Hare) 9+
 – Marcus Sedgwick, The Book of Dead Days (Orion) 10+
 – Jean Ure, Bad Alice (Hodder & Stoughton) 10+

The Curious Incident won two Whitbread Awards: Novel (not children's book) and overall "Book of the Year". Haddon and Almond made the Carnegie Medal shortlist for the listed works.2002 (9)
 # Sonya Hartnett, Thursday's Child (Penguin Australia, 2000; Walker) 12+ + Keith Gray, Warehouse (Red Fox) 13+
 + Elizabeth Laird, Jake's Tower (Heinemann, MacMillan) 11+
 + Linda Newbery, The Shell House (David Fickling) 12+
 + Terry Pratchett, The Amazing Maurice and his Educated Rodents (Doubleday, Transworld) 11+ —the 28th Discworld book, the first for children
 + Marcus Sedgwick, The Dark Horse (Orion) 12+
 – Bernard Ashley, Revenge House (Orchard)
 – Julie Bertagna, Exodus (Macmillan)
 – Susan Cooper, Green Boy (Bodley Head)

Pratchett won the Carnegie Medal for the listed work; Laird, Newbery and Sedgwick made the shortlist.2001 (10)
   # Kevin Crossley-Holland, The Seeing Stone (Orion) 9+
 + Allan Ahlberg, My Brother's Ghost (Puffin) 9+
 + Celia Rees, Witch Child (Bloomsbury) 11+
 + Karen Wallace, Raspberries on the Yangtze (Simon & Schuster) 11+
 – Adèle Geras, Troy (Fickling/Scholastic) 11+
 – Gaye Hiçyilmaz,  Girl in Red (Orion) 11+
 – Eva Ibbotson, Journey to the River Sea (Macmillan) 10+
 – Margaret Mahy, 24 Hours (Collins)
 – Jan Mark, Heathrow Nights (Hodder) 12+
 – Beverley Naidoo, The Other Side of Truth (Puffin)

Naidoo won the Carnegie Medal for the listed work; Geras was a highly commended runner up.

 Shortlists before 2001 

The longlist was inaugurated July 2001 as the program was rescheduled to conclude in the fall (October) rather than the spring (March). Through year 2000 the award covered books published during the preceding calendar year and the shortlist was the only official distinction other than the Prize itself.2000 Jacqueline Wilson, The Illustrated Mum (Transworld) David Almond, Kit's Wilderness (Hodder Children's Books)
 Bernard Ashley, Little Soldier (Orchard)
 Susan Cooper, King of Shadows (Bodley Head)
 Jan Mark, The Eclipse of the Century (Scholastic)
 J.K. Rowling, Harry Potter and the Prisoner of Azkaban (Bloomsbury)

 1999 Susan Price 	The Sterkarm Handshake 	Scholastic UK
 David Almond, Kit's Wilderness 
 J.K. Rowling, Harry Potter and the Chamber of Secrets (Bloomsbury) 1998 Henrietta Branford 	Fire, Bed and Bone 	Walker Books
 Jamila Gavin, The Track of the Wind (Mammoth)  which year?
 J.K. Rowling, Harry Potter and the Philosopher's Stone (Bloomsbury Publishing) 
 Jane Stemp, Secret Songs (Hodder Children's Books) 1997 Melvin Burgess 	Junk 	Penguin
 Jamila Gavin, The Track of the Wind  which year?
 Keith Gray, Creepers 
 Terry Pratchett 

Junk also won the 1996 Carnegie Medal.1996 Philip Pullman 	Northern Lights
The Golden Compass (US) 	Scholastic UKand Alison Prince 	The Sherwood Hero 	Macmillan
 Russell Hoban, The Trokeville Way (Jonathan Cape)
 Beverley Naidoo, No Turning Back 

Northern Lights also won the 1995 Carnegie Medal.1995 Lesley Howarth 	MapHead 	Walker Books

 1994 — Jamila Gavin, The Eye of the Horse 1993 — Terry Pratchett 1992  — Jamila Gavin, The Wheel of Surya – Special runner-up 1991 — Gillian Cross, Wolf (Oxford)

Cross and Wolf won the 1990 Carnegie Medal.1987 — Anne Fine, Madame Doubtfire (Puffin) "Runner up" 1984 — Anne Fine, The Granny Project (Puffin) 1983 — Gillian Cross, The Dark Behind the Curtain1980 — Gillian Cross, The Iron Way1975 — Anne Fine, The Summer House Loon (Puffin)1969' 
 — John Christopher, The Pool of Fire'' —The Tripods #3

See also

 Blue Peter Book Awards
 Carnegie Medal
 Children's Laureate
 Kate Greenaway Medal
 Nestle Smarties Book Prize

Notes

References

External links
 Guardian children's fiction prize (top page)
British Children's Literary Awards

  
Awards established in 1967
1967 establishments in the United Kingdom